Portlaoise GAA is a Gaelic Athletic Association (GAA) affiliated hurling, Gaelic football and camogie club based in Portlaoise, the county town of Laois in Ireland.

History

Founding
Portlaoise was founded in the very early years of the Association and its members have had a huge influence on the progress of GAA in the county from its beginning. For its achievements on and off the field and in the promotion of the games and the GAA the club has been acknowledged as a leader in the field.

Inaugural meeting
The inaugural meeting of Portlaoise GAA club took place in the Town Hall on Monday 28 November 1887. It was a public meeting called by placard and there was a big attendance. Amongst those present were Dr. Higgins, coroner for the Queen's County (Laois), who presided, N. Walsh, C.T.C., P.A. Meehan, T.C., C. McDermott, T.C., P. Kelly, T.C., T. Lawlor T.C., C.E. Corcoran, solicitor, Mark Walsh, J. Moore, P.J. Hegarty, R.P. Fennell, P.Fitzpatrick, M. Brophy and J.T. Delaney.

Dr Higgins said that the object was to form a branch of the GAA in the town of Maryboro (Portlaoise), an object worthy of the town's entire support. "It is a very desirable movement", he added. "Nearly every town in Ireland of the size and importance of Maryborough had formed a branch of the Association and it was certainly time for Maryborough to follow suit. They had quite as many athletes in their district as any other town in Ireland and I am sure that when they are afforded an opportunity of displaying their ability they would do so in a manner worthy of the Queen's County."

Mr Fennell explained the aims of the GAA and said that it was a non-political and non-sectarian organisation. Mr Meehan proposed the first resolution "that a branch of the Gaelic Athletic Association be hereby established in the town and that it be called the William O'Brien Branch". Mr Kelly seconded the motion. Dr Higgins was proposed as president and Mr Corcoran as vice-president. Mr Corcoran said that "they all knew that Mr O'Brien was a friend of the oppressed tenantry in Ireland and had, or ought to have the sympathy of every Irishman." (William O'Brien was incarcerated in Tullamore Jail at the time).

There was a strong condemnation of the "noisy clique" who tried to split the Association in Thurles a short time earlier. Mr Kelly proposed that R.P. Fennell be secretary and that J. Moore be treasurer and Mr J. Higgins, clothier, seconded.

After being thanked from the floor for presiding at the meeting, Dr Higgins replied that it was always his wish, indeed his duty, to forward the interests of the National cause in the district of Maryborough since he had come into it and that the town had always been more prominently identified with the movement than any other part of Ireland. Dr Higgins' words were received with enthusiastic
applause.

Clerical influence
Early Portlaoise GAA history is dominated by two clerics. Local curate, Fr J. J. Kearney, was an inspirational figure in the early decades of the 20th century. He popularised hurling and football amongst the town youth and acquired a field for the club as early as 1907. Fr Kearney went on to become a legendary county chairman and seeing the countys greater needs for a sports field, he oversaw the purchase of those same grounds by the county in 1919. This field, later named O'Moore Park, was developed into a major provincial stadium in the decades that followed. On the playing fields Fr Kearney too left his mark because he was the chief organisation figure behind the county's historic and only All-Ireland senior hurling success in 1915.
Then in the 1920s came along fine young hurler by the name of Matt Walsh who helped the club win its first senior hurling title in 1928. He became Fr Matt Walsh and retained a great love for the games and the club and county even though he spent most of his life on the mission fields of Nigeria. On a trip home in 1960 he trained the senior hurling team that was pipped by a point by Borris-in-Ossory in the county final. Fr Matt remained as President of the club and an inspiration for players and officials alike until his death in the 1990s.

The role of the Christian Brothers in the promotion of Gaelic Games in the town too has to be acknowledged. The names of Bro. Ennis, Bro. O'Mahoney, Bro. Nolan, Bro. Somers, and Bro. Beausang are among the names fondly remembered in the club for their enormous contribution to the success of the club.

Early Success

First Leinster title
On 13 October 1889, Maryborough had the distinction of winning the Leinster semi-final and final on the same day. This happened in Inchicore when the Laois representatives defeated Bray Emmetts and then accounted for Louth champions, Newtown Blues in the final.

The county champions in those days picked the county team. Maryborough had beaten Wolfhill in the county final and had co-opted a number of players from Wolfhill
and some other clubs for their same day double-header in Inchicore. They proved to be a formidable outfit. But the All-Ireland final was fixed for the following Sunday and the Laois and Leinster champions were unable to muster the same formidable line out because of the restricted travel services of the period. Unsurprisingly they were defeated by the Tipperary champions, Bohercrowe, before a big attendance. The Maryborough team on final day was: J Delaney (goalie and captain), J Whelan, T Cushen, P Cushen, T Cushen, M Cushen, M Colleston, T McDonnell, T Conroy, J Connor, J Dunne, J Fleming, J Walsh, J Teehan, D Teehan, J Murphy, N Maher, P Brady, T Troy, M Drennan.

Modern era success
The next time Portlaoise won a Leinster title was in the 1971/72 season. The club championship had only got under way the previous year and so, once again the county town club was soon to leave its mark on the championship. In the Leinster final against Athlone, Portlaoise found themselves eleven points adrift with only twenty minutes remaining. But, in an amazing turn around the Laois champions blitzed their opponents to capture the coveted title. Two late points saw them beaten by Derry GAA champions, Bellaghy, by a single point in the All-Ireland semi-final on a 1–11 to 1-10 scoreline. Bellaghy went on to win the title. The team that played Bellaghy was: Mick Mulhall, Mick Murphy, Jim Hughes, Teddy Fennelly, Tom Walsh, Mick McDonald, John Grant, Mick Dooley, Cyril O'Meara, John Fennell, Harry Mulhaire, Larry Dunne, Brian Delaney, Paschal Delaney, John Joe Ging. Sub: Louis Harkin.

All-Ireland success
Portlaoise's greatest hour eventually arrived in 1983 when as county champions of 1982, they won out in Leinster, defeated St Finbarr's of Cork in the All-Ireland semi-final and won the All-Ireland final by 0–12 to 2–0 against Clann na nGael (Roscommon). That team was: Mick Mulhall, John Bohane. Timmy Bergin, Mark Kavanagh, Colm Browne, Mick Lillis, Bernie Conroy, Eamon Whelan, Mick Dooley, Noel Pendergast, Pat Critchley, Tom Pendergast, Liam Scully (capt.), Joe Keenan, Gerry Browne. Sub. Billy Bohane.

Leinster Club of the Year awards
For its achievements on the field of play and for its effective management structures the county town club was selected as Leinster Club of the Year on different occasions in the 1980s.

Men's Senior Football success
In football, Portlaoise, by winning its 35th title in 2019, are top of the honours list in Laois and with seven provincial crowns are also on top of Leinster. The club have been runners up on 10 occasions (twice as Mayborough)

There was a 57-year gap between titles four and five, the former was won in 1907 and the latter in 1964. From 1964 on the club has won the senior football title almost every second year since then.

Senior Hurling success
The senior hurlers racked up nine titles in the quarter of a century from 1981 to add to the two earlier ones won in 1928 and 1943. The team of 1928 included: Jimmy Fortune, Mick Dunne (both Main Street), John Dunne (The Hill) John Kelly (Bloomfield), Mick Conroy (Harpur's Lane), Paddy Dunne (Tower Hill), Paddy Doran (Borris Road), Bill Ouinlan (Abbeyleix Road), Ger Kelly (Kellyville Park), Andy Carter (Clonkeen), John Hogan (Army), Tom Whelan (who lived in Glasgow), Billy Carroll (who later lived at Kilbricken, Mountrath), Larry Cushen (Grattan Street) Jimmy Dargan (Green Road), Jim Quinn and John Delaney (Ridge Road).

The record of the hurlers is headlined by two appearances in Leinster club finals in the 1980s and 1990s and a four-in-a-row of county title wins from 1981 to 1984. John Joe Ging captained all four-in-a-row wins and all finals were won at different venues. The team that won the 1981 title, which was the first won by the county town side for 37 years was: Sean Delaney, Jimmy Harding, John Joe Ging, Jack Kavanagh, Sean Bergin, John Bohane, John Taylor, Jimmy Keenan, Joe Keenan, Pat Critchley, Billy Bohane, Liam Bergin, Eddie Condon, Seamus Plunkett, Matt Keegan. The four-in-a-row teams were managed by the great Tipperary maestro, Jimmy Doyle, assisted by the local maestro, Tom Lalor.

Ladies' Football
The ladies' club was originally formed in 1985 after a meeting and approximately 50 members joined in the first year. Two teams were entered into the championship. Tom Daly R.I.P was one of the founding members.

October 1987 saw the ladies' junior footballers win their first title against Mountrath under the guidance of Kevin Farrell. They became the first ladies team to win any title representing Portlaoise GAA Club.

The panel was Paula Kelly, Jackie Walsh, Monica O’Brien, Breda Carter, Geraldine Whelan, Noleen Duggan, Mary O'Loughlin, Cora Graham, Kathleen Tierney, Mairead Ryan, Jacinta White, Catherine Gavin, Deirdre Fennell, Angela Keogh, Lorraine Dowling, Una Fennell, Celina O’Sullivan, Marissa Martley, Margo O’ Callaghan, Angela Strong, Ann Pike, Ann Duggan.

In 1989 having won the title once again, beating rivals Ballypickas in the final the ladies were promoted to senior ranks but failed to make the final stages of the championship.

The following year, having gone back to junior ranks the ladies were beaten in the semi-final of the championship but in 1991 the club won its third title defeating Crettyard 2–5 to 1–5. The panel included Annett Lawlor, Ann Pike, Jacinta White, Catherine O'Reilly, Jackie Walsh, Noleen Duggan, Mary O’Loughlin, Cora Graham, Kathleen Murphy, Mairead Ryan, Catherine Gavin, Kathleen Tierney, Sharon Conroy, Marita Costigan, Helen Kelly, Eunice Delaney, Olivia Conroy, Mary Conroy, Lorraine Dowling.

The ladies' club then disbanded for a couple of years and in 1992 Frank Keenan senior club secretary approached Brendan Fitzpatrick with the view of setting the club up again.

A new committee was elected consisting of Brendan Tynan as club chairman, Brendan Fitzpatrick was club secretary, Rita Fitzpatrick was elected club treasurer and the committee including Anne Scanlon, Cora Graham and Jackie Walsh, Cora Tynan and Muddy Carroll.

The club again disbanded and re-emerged in 2000 as a juvenile club. The club started out at U-14 level and were entered into the U-14 Championship.

In 2002, the club entered three teams at u-12 u-14 and at u-16 level.

In 2007, Portlaoise ladies played at senior level for the first time since reforming.

They competed in their first Laois Ladies' Senior Football Club Championship final in 2016 before being beaten by Sarsfields. It was the same result when they again played Sarsfields in the 2017 and 2018 final. Portlaoise were to win their first Laois Ladies' Senior Football Club Championship title in 2020 when they defeated reigning champions Sarsfields who were going for nine-in-a-row on a scoreline of 1–12 to 0–12.

Camogie
Portlaoise began running the camogie wing of the club in 2007 and in 2019 the club competed at the adult level for the first time when they played in the Junior ranks of the Laois Camogie Championship. They made it to the final that year where they came against Camross and lost out on a scoreline of 5–2 to 3–5.
Portlaoise won their first adult level trophy defeating O'Moore's on a scoreline of 3–12 to 1–04 to win the 2020 Laois Junior Camogie Championship. This game was the delayed replay of the 2020 final played on the 19th September 2021 due to the COVID-19 Pandemic. Portlaoise backed this win up with their successful defence of the trophy in 2021 defeating Camross Camogie 1–15 to 2–05 in O'Moore Park on 20 November 2021.

Youth revival
The success at senior level has its roots in a strong youth set-up which has been in the club since it was reformed in 1949. A few years later that very successful town club, The Rovers, as well as another club, Kilminchy, joined forces with the Portlaoise club to forge a very formidable unit, from which the current Portlaoise club grew from strength to strength into the sixties and the decades since.

There has always been an emphasis on fitness and skill instilled into the younger players and sportsmanship figures highly in the club ethos. This is imparted by dedicated coaches drawn from throughout the community. Good organisation at under age level has ensured a constant supply of county titles and historic wins have been registered in many national competitions including the prestigious Feile na nGael.

Chairmen
Among the long-serving chairmen since the 1950s were Joe Bracken sr., and Peadar Molloy, long serving secretaries included, Jim Loughlin, Jimmy Cotter and Bill Phelan while Dick Sides was treasurer for nearly thirty years.

The current chairman is long serving club member Eamonn "Teddy" Fennelly. Teddy's father (also Teddy) has also been club chairman, 1964, 1971–76, 1977–81.

Laois Team of the Millennium
Four Portlaoise footballers were selected on the Laois Footballers of the Millennium team for the year 2000. Paddy Bracken was in goal, Colm Browne at right half back, Eamon “Atch” Whelan, at full-forward and Tom Prendergast at left full-forward. 
The team was: Paddy Bracken (Portlaoise), Dan Walsh (Army), Dick Miller (Annanough), John Conway (Arles), Colm Browne (Portlaoise), Paddy Dunne (Park), Mick Haughney (Graiguecullen), Tommy Murphy (Graiguecullen), Bill Delaney (Stradbally), Jack Kenna (O’Dempseys), Jack Delaney (Stradbally), Fintan Walsh (Ballylinan), Danny Douglas (Army), Eamon Whelan (Portlaoise), Tom Prendergast (Portlaoise).

Two Portlaoise players were honoured on the Millennium Hurling team, John Taylor at left half back, and Pat Critchley at midfield. Portlaoise Rovers player, Tom Byrne, was at centre half back.

The team was: Timmy Fitzpatrick (Kilcotton), Tom Finlay (Ballygeehan), Jackie Bergin (Abbeyleix), Mick Mahon (Rathdowney), Ollie Fennell (Clonad), Tom Byrne (Rovers and Clonad), John Taylor (Portlaoise), Pat Critchley (Portlaoise), Billy Bohane (Clonad), Michael Walsh (Ballinakill), Harry Gray (Rathdowney), Christy O’Brien (Borris-in-Ossory), Frank Keenan (Camross), P.J. Cuddy (Camross), Paddy Lalor (Abbeyleix).

County team involvement
The constant supply of talented players to the county side has helped the great Laois hurling resurgence in the 1980s, the magnificent National Football League triumph of 1986, the unforgettable All-Ireland successes of the county minors in the 1990s and early 2000s and the historic Leinster senior football championship win by the Laois team in 2003. All these teams were powered by the irrepressible Portlaoise supply chain.

Portlaoise players who played with Leinster

Football
1961. Paddy Bracken; 1963. Noel Delaney (Sean McDermotts). 1964: Noel Delaney. 1965: Paddy Bracken. 1966: Paddy Bracken. 1967: Paddy Bracken and Noel Delaney. 1977: Eamon Whelan. 1978: Eamon Whelan. 1979: Eamon Whelan. 1980: Eamon Whelan, Tom Prendergast, Colm Browne, Liam Scully, Mick Mulhall. 1981: Eamon Whelan, Colm Browne. 1982: Eamon Whelan, Colm Browne. 1983: Colm Browne, Gerry Browne, Tom Prendergast. 1985. Colm Browne, Gerry Browne. 1986. Gerry Browne. 1987: Gerry Browne. 2003: Ian Fitzgerald, Kevin Fitzpatrick; 2004: Kevin Fitzpatrick. 2006: Aidan Fennelly. 2008: Cahir Healy. 2012: Cahir Healy and Kieran Lillis. 2013: Kieran Lillis.

Hurling
1940: Paddy Farrell. 1941: Paddy Farrell. 1942: Paddy Farrell. 1943: Paddy Farrell. 1945: Jim Brien, Peter Ahearne. 1946: Peter Ahearne. 1950: Tom Byrne (Portlaoise Rovers). 1952: Tom Byrne. 1982: John Bohane. 1983: John Bohane. 1984: Pat Critchley. 1985: Pat Critchley, John Bohane, John Taylor. 1986: Pat Critchley, John Bohane. 1987: Pat Critchley, John Bohane, John Taylor. 1989: John Taylor. 1993: Cyril Duggan. 1994: Cyril Duggan. 1995: Cyril Duggan. 1996: Niall Rigney. 1997: Niall Rigney. 1998: Niall Rigney. 1999: Niall Rigney. 2002: Niall Rigney; 2008: Tommy Fitzgerald.

GAA Oral History Project
On Friday September Portlaoise club members Teddy Fennelly and Brian Delaney took part in the GAA Oral History project discussed their involvement with Portlaoise GAA Club, both as players and administrators. They outlined the evolution of the club, its successes and failures, and the impact of the economic downturn on plans for new facilities. They reflected on various members of the club who played key roles in the development of the club. They also described the involvement of their respective parents and children in Gaelic Games in Portlaoise.

Link to GAA Oral History Project page

Club grounds

Páirc Uí Fhaoláin
It was not until the late 1970s that Portlaoise again had its own playing fields, on land adjacent to O'Moore Park on Father Brown Avenue, purchased from Laois County Board which helped fund a major development at the county grounds in the 1980s.

The club centre was named after one of the club's most inspirational players, Paschal Delaney, while the grounds were named after one of the club's most loyal and loved officials, Bill Phelan, who was club secretary for many years and also county chairman. The committee room was named after another long serving secretary, Jimmy Cotter.

Rathleague
With the growth of the number of teams and training demands for girls as well as boys, the grounds next to O'Moore Park, with only two full-size pitches, was proving too cramped for a growing urban club with over twenty teams including adult, juvenile and ladies football. At a special AGM it was decided to relocate to a 38-acre site at Rathleague and this is where the club now calls home.

The club began development of Rathleague in 2009 which was completed in 2011. The pitch in Rathleague, near Bloomfield Cross, contains many pitches, juvenile and senior, including an all-weather senior pitch.

Facilities are being added on a staged basis.

Roll of Honour

Men's Football

Senior
All-Ireland Senior Club Football Championship Winners (1) 1982-83
Leinster Senior Club Football Championship: Winners (7) 1971, 1976, 1982, 1985, 1987, 2004, 2009
Laois Senior Football Championship: Winners (35) 1889, 1897, 1906, 1907, 1964, 1966, 1967, 1968, 1970, 1971, 1976, 1979, 1981, 1982, 1984, 1985, 1986, 1987, 1990, 1991, 1999, 2002, 2004, 2007, 2008, 2009, 2010, 2011, 2012, 2013, 2014, 2015, 2017, 2018, 2019

Intermediate
Laois Intermediate Football Championship: Winners (5) 1939, 1956, 1972, 1975, 1982

U-21
Laois U-21 Football Championship: Winners (18) 1965, 1974, 1975, 1976, 1977, 1978, 1979, 1980, 1997, 1998, 1999, 2000, 2001, 2002, 2005, 2006, 2007, 2013

Junior
Laois Junior A Football Championship: Winners (10) 1908, 1911, 1935, 1973, 1977, 1988, 1992, 1999, 2002, 2005
Laois Junior B Football Championship: Winners (1) 2002
Laois Junior C Football Championship: Winners (3) 2003, 2008, 2009

Minor
Laois Minor Football Championship: Winners (26) 1940, 1941, 1951, 1954, 1956, 1961, 1962, 1963, 1972, 1973, 1974, 1976, 1978, 1979, 1981, 1984, 1993, 1995, 1998, 1999, 2002, 2003, 2007, 2008, 2011, 2012

Hurling

Senior
Laois Senior Hurling Championship: Winners (11) 1928, 1943, 1981, 1982, 1983, 1984, 1987, 1989, 1991, 1998, 2004
ACHL Div 1: Winners (3) 1986, 1995, 1996

Intermediate
Laois Intermediate Hurling Championship: Winners (2) 1935, 1942

U-21 
Laois U-21 Hurling Championship: Winners (5) 1978, 1981, 1988, 2000, 2015

Junior
Laois Junior A Hurling Championship: Winners (4) 1965, 1987, 1993, 2013
Laois Junior C Hurling Championship: Winners (1) 2018

Minor
Laois Minor Hurling Championship: Winners (21) 1949, 1950, 1952, 1953, 1955, 1956, 1958, 1959, 1960, 1961, 1962, 1964, 1965, 1972, 1984, 1985, 1989, 1996, 1997, 1999, 2001

U-17
Laois U-17 A Championship:Winners (10) 1972, 1976, 1982, 1983, 1984, 1988, 1989, 1996, 1998, 2002

Ladies' Football

Senior
Laois Ladies' Senior Football Club Championship: (1) 2020
Laois Ladies' Senior Football Club Championship B: (1) 2014

Intermediate
Laois Minor Championship: Winners (1) 2006

Junior
Laois Junior Championship: Winners (4) 1987, 1988, 1992, 2005

Minor
Laois Minor Championship: Winners (3) 2007, 2008, 2017

Camogie

Junior
Laois Camogie Junior Club Championship: (2) 2020, 2021
Laois Camogie Junior B Club Championship: (1) 1995

Minor
Laois Camogie Junior Club Championship: (2) 2020, 2021
Laois Camogie Junior B Club Championship: (1) 1995

Juvenile Men Roll of Honour

Hurling
 U-12: (10) 1972, 1973, 1974, 1975, 1979, 1983, 1984, 1991, 1993, 2010
 U-14: (20) 1973, 1974, 1975, 1980, 1981, 1984, 1985, 1986, 1988, 1993, 1995, 1996, 1997, 2000, 2001, 2004, 2008, 2011, 2012, 2014
 U-15: (1) 2019
 Feile: (17) 1976, 1980, 1981, 1984, 1985, 1986, 1987, 1993, 1995, 1996, 2000, 200, 2003, 2004, 2008, 2010, 2011, 2012
 U-16: (24) 1960, 1962, 1963, 1964, 1965, 1966, 1968, 1973, 1974, 1975, 1978, 1982, 1983, 1984, 1986, 1987, 1988, 1989, 1992, 1995, 1997, 2002, 2003, 2014
 U-17: (10) 1972, 1976, 1982, 1983, 1984, 1988, 1989, 1996, 1998, 2002

Football
 U-11: (1) 2019
 U-12: (16) 1970, 1971, 1972, 1973, 1978, 1979, 1982, 1996, 2000, 2001, 2002, 2005, 2007, 2009, 2010, 2016
 U-12 B: (2) 1970, 1973
 U-14: (21) 1961, 1973, 1975, 1976, 1977, 1978, 1981, 1984, 1991, 1992, 1993, 1994, 1995, 1996, 1998, 2003, 2007, 2008, 2009, 2011, 2012
 U-15: (1) 2019
 Feile: (15) 1984, 1991, 1992, 1993, 1995, 1996, 2001, 2003, 2004, 2007, 2008, 2009, 2011, 2012, 2014
 U-16: (19) 1961, 1962, 1963, 1964, 1968,1974, 1975, 1977, 1978, 1986, 1993, 1995, 1999, 2000, 2003, 2005, 2006, 2009, 2010
 U-17: (13) 1965, 1971, 1971, 1972, 1978, 1982, 1983, 1984, 1988, 1989, 1996, 1998, 2000

Juvenile Ladies' Roll of Honour

Football
 U-12: (8) 2001, 2002, 2003, 2005, 2013, 2014, 2015, 2018
 U-14 A: (8) 2003, 2004, 2005, 2006, 2007, 2011, 2015, 2016
 U-14 B: (2) 2004, 2008
 U-16: (6) 2004, 2005, 2006, 2007, 2017, 2018

Camogie
 U-12: (3) 2014, 2017, 2019
 U-14: (2) 2016, 2017
 U-16: (2) 2018, 2019
 U-16 Shield: (1) 2009
 U-16 League: (1) 2017
 Feile: (2) 2016, 2017

Laois Men's Senior Club Football Championships

Note: The 1889, 1897, 1906 and 1907 titles were won under the name Maryborough. In October 1920, the Town Commission passed a resolution that Maryborough be renamed Portlaoise.

All Ireland Men's Senior Club Football

All-Ireland Men's Senior Club Football - runners-up

Leinster Men's Senior Club Football

Leinster Men's Senior Club Football - runners-up

Senior Hurling

Leinster Senior Club Hurling Championships - runners-up

Laois Ladies' Senior Football Club Championship

Laois Ladies' Senior Football Club Championship - runners-up

All-Stars
Portlaoise has produced some of the greatest hurlers and footballers in the county and country over the past quarter of a century. All-Star awards have come the way of Colm Browne 1986 in football and Pat Critchley 1985 in hurling.

Pat Critchley - 1985 Hurling Midfielder
Critchley's selection on the 1985 All-Star hurling team made him the first from the county to achieve that honour.

The Portlaoise clubman was selected at midfield alongside such hurlers as John Fenton, Nicky English and Joe Cooney. Several players have emulated the feat since in football but he remains the sole Laois recipient of a hurling award. Many, including Critchley himself, believed that John Taylor was equally deserving of the honour. Fate decreed otherwise: in the summer of 1985, Pat hurled one of his best ever games against Wexford in the Leinster championship and Laois reached the provincial final for the first time in 36 years.

A native of St Brigid's Place in Portlaoise, Critchley played at National League level in hurling, football and basketball. With Portlaoise GAA club, he won 14 Laois senior county championships - seven each in hurling and football. He also went on to win three Leinster Club Football Championships and one All-Ireland Club Football Championship with Portlaoise. Critchley also won one Limerick senior county football championship with Thomond College.

Colm Browne - 1986 Football Wing half-back
Templemore-based Garda Siochána Colm Browne was born in London, a stylish wing back who made the breakthrough (alongside his brother Gerry) on to a Portlaoise club team in the mid 1970s. He was captain in Laois's National Football League victory in 1986 and was rewarded with an All-Star award later the same year alongside Ballyroan man Liam Irwin. He was in the company of players like Pat Spillane, Mikey Sheehy, Mick Lyons and Charlie Nelligan on that team.

Three years earlier he had been player-manager when Portlaoise won the All-Ireland Club Football Championship title.

He subsequently took over the reins from Richie Connor as Laois manager in 1994, spending three years in charge. He then spent a number of years in charge of Tipperary footballers during which time the Premier County showed a marked improvement in their performances.

And in 2001 after Tom Cribbin had vacated the Laois position, Browne returned to manage his native county, spending a two-year term in the role, leading Laois into Division One in 2002 but quitting after the county suffered a heavy defeat at the hands of Meath.

Current management teams

Senior Football manager
The current senior football manager is Kevin Fitzpatrick.

Senior Hurling manager
The current senior hurling manager is Derek Delaney.

Club Board

Cathaoirleach
Eamon Fennelly

Leas-Cathaoirleach
Catherine Fitzgerald

Runaí
Malcolm Nealon

Cisteoir
Declan McEvoy

PRO
Jennifer Fitzpatrick

Juvenile teams
Portlaoise has an excellent record at Féile na nGael (Hurling) and Féile Péil na nÓg (football) recording wins in Féile na nGael in 1980, 1981, 1993, and 2009, and wins in Féile na nÓg in 1983, 1992, and 2009. In 2009 Portlaoise recorded a rare double, winning the Féile Péil na nÓg in Kildare, Division 3, and the Féile na nGael at home in Laois/Offaly, Division 2.

In 2010, the u-12 players won both the hurling and football league and championship, after a highly successful year.

In 2009, the u-12a footballers won the football Championship, while the u-12a hurlers won the league.
In 2012, the u-14s recorded a division 2 Feile title after defeating St.Johns of Antrim in Croke Park

County Final Panel 2018
1. Graham Brody
2. Colin Finn 
3. David Seale
4. Gary Saunders 
5. Chris Finn 
6. Cahir Healy
7. David Holland
8. Ciarán McEvoy 
9. Kieran Lillis
10. Gareth Dillon 
11. Conor Boyle 
12. Benny Carroll
13. Ricky Maher 
14. Paul Cahillane
15. Craig Rogers

Notable players
 Colm Browne
 Gerry Browne
 Pat Critchley
 Sean Delaney
 Ian Fitzgerald
 Karl Lenihan
 Mick Lillis
 Peter McNulty
 Colm Parkinson 
 Tom Prendergast 
 John Taylor
 Zach Tuohy

References

External links
 Portlaoise GAA Official Website
 Laois Today
 Laois GAA Official Website

Gaelic games clubs in County Laois
Hurling clubs in County Laois
Gaelic football clubs in County Laois
Sport in Portlaoise